Hoçë e Qytetit is a village in Prizren municipality, Kosovo.

Notes

References 

Villages in Prizren